Pedro Cachín was the defending champion but chose not to defend his title.

Carlos Alcaraz won the title after defeating Facundo Bagnis 6–4, 6–4 in the final.

Seeds

Draw

Finals

Top half

Bottom half

References

External links
Main draw
Qualifying draw

Open de Oeiras III - 1